Agabus africanus is a species of predatory diving beetle belonging to the family Dytiscidae. It is endemic to Tunisia, where it is found in the area of the Cap Bon peninsula. It is not common.

References

Agabus (beetle)
Endemic fauna of Tunisia
Beetles of North Africa
Beetles described in 1998